Astelia trinervia is a species of rhizomatous tufted perennial native to New Zealand. An example occurrence of this species is in the North Island's Hamilton Ecological District, where it occurs in the understory associated with Blechnum discolor (crown fern) and overstory forest elements of rimu and Nothofagus trees.

Line notes

References
 Flora of New Zealand. 2004. Astelia: Banks et Sol. ex R. Br.
 C. Michael Hogan. 2009. Crown Fern: Blechnum discolor, Globaltwitcher.com, ed. N. Stromberg

Asteliaceae
Endemic flora of New Zealand